Harald Reumel, known by his nickname Brammerloo is a former Surinamese football player, who played in the Surinamese Hoofdklasse for The Goal Getters and S.V. Transvaal, and for the Suriname national team. He spent most of his professional playing career with S.V. Transvaal, winning six consecutive national titles, and two CONCACAF Champions Cup, finishing as the league top scorer in 1966.

Career

TGG
Reumel began his football career in 1961, playing for The Goal Getters (TGG) from Moengo, before joining S.V. Transvaal in the capital Paramaribo in 1963.

SV Transvaal
At Transvaal he became known as one third of the infamous trio together with Roy Vanenburg and Edwin Schal. The club dominated the league, winning six consecutive national titles from 1965 to 1970. The 1966 season saw Reumel finish as league top goal scorer. He helped Transvaal to qualify for the 1968 CONCACAF Champions' Cup, facing Aurora F.C. from Guatemala in the semi-finals, where they would be eliminated after a brawl between the supporters of both teams. In 1971, he helped Transvaal to win their first CONCACAF Champions' Cup, becoming the first Surinamese club to win the Continental title by defeating CRKSV Jong Colombia from the Netherlands Antilles 4–2 on aggregate score in the final, Transvaal would also win the national title that same year undefeated.

Transvaal won the national title again the following year, earning the team another berth in the Champions Cup. Making it to the finals once more, Transvaal finished as runners-up in the competition, losing to Atlético Español from Mexico 5–1 on aggregate score in the final. In 1981 Reumel helped Transvaal to the 1981 CONCACAF Champions' Cup finals once more, winning the title 2–1 on aggregate score against C.D. Atlético Marte from El Salvador.

Considered one of the best football players in the clubs' history, Reumel helped his team secure six national titles, and two CONCACAF Champions Cup trophies during the span of his career, while finishing as the league top goal scorer once.

International career

Suriname
Reumel played for the Suriname national team. He made his debut on 13 October 1963, playing in the qualifiers for the 1964 Summer Olympics, against the Netherlands Antilles with the match ending in a 3–0 win, and Reumel scoring on his debut. He scored his second goal in the qualifiers against Panama, scoring the third goal in a 6–1 win. He also played a part in the country's 1966 FIFA World Cup qualifying campaign, having also played in the 1966 Coupe Duvalier in Port-au-Prince, Haiti.

Career statistics

International goals
Scores and results list Suriname' goal tally first.

Honors

Club
S.V. Transvaal
 SVB Hoofdklasse (6): 1967, 1968, 1969, 1970, 1973, 1974
 CONCACAF Champions Cup (2): 1973, 1981

Individual
SVB Hoofdklasse Top Goalscorer (1): 1966

References 

Living people
People from Marowijne District
Surinamese footballers
Suriname international footballers
S.V. Transvaal players
SVB Eerste Divisie players
Year of birth missing (living people)
Association football forwards